Martin Schlossár (born 24 July 1998) is a Slovak footballer who plays for Slovan Bratislava as a midfielder.

Club career

Slovan Bratislava
Schlossár made his Fortuna Liga debut for Slovan Bratislava against Orion Tip Sereď on 14 May 2022.

Honours
Slovan Bratislava
Fortuna Liga: 2021–22

References

External links
 ŠK Slovan Bratislava official club profile
 
 Fortuna Liga profile
 Futbalnet profile

1998 births
Living people
Place of birth missing (living people)
Slovak footballers
Association football midfielders
ŠK Slovan Bratislava players
2. Liga (Slovakia) players
Slovak Super Liga players